John Burns (born 21 December 1948) is a British weightlifter. He competed at the 1976 Summer Olympics and the 1980 Summer Olympics.

References

1948 births
Living people
British male weightlifters
Olympic weightlifters of Great Britain
Weightlifters at the 1976 Summer Olympics
Weightlifters at the 1980 Summer Olympics
Place of birth missing (living people)
Commonwealth Games medallists in weightlifting
Commonwealth Games gold medallists for Wales
Weightlifters at the 1978 Commonwealth Games
Weightlifters at the 1982 Commonwealth Games
20th-century British people
21st-century British people
Medallists at the 1978 Commonwealth Games
Medallists at the 1982 Commonwealth Games